An Evening with The Monkees: The 45th Anniversary Tour (also called Here They Come!: 45th Anniversary Tour) was the fourth and final reunion tour by American pop rock group The Monkees to feature Davy Jones, Micky Dolenz and Peter Tork together (Jones died of a heart attack on February 29, 2012). It was the group's first tour in a decade following Monkeemania, which ran from 2001 to 2002. The tour visited the United Kingdom, the United States and Canada. Due to the success of the first North American leg, a second leg was planned for the fall of 2011; however, dates were suddenly cancelled without explanation.

Background

In October 2010, Davy Jones stated the group (minus Michael Nesmith) were reuniting in 2011, hinting at the possibility of the tour.  The three members of the group announced the tour on the BBC's The One Show.  The group stated the initial run was predominately in the UK, however, they hoped the success of the tour could be expanded to the U.S.  The first ten dates of the tour were released on February 21, 2011.  Shortly afterwards, dates in the U.S. and Canada were revealed as well.  It was later reported that, if successful, the group will earn nearly 1 million each.  Jones remarked that the tour was not about money but reconnecting with fans.

The tour came as a surprise to fans, following the backstage drama of the previous reunion tour. Group member Peter Tork stated that he had a meltdown on the last tour, causing tension between the other members of the tour. Tork further commented that he considered quitting towards the end of the tour but eventually chose to stay until the end of the trek.

The tour was described as a "full multimedia experience." With visual design by Rachel Lichtman, it displayed clips from the group's popular TV series, rare and unseen adverts and footage from the cult film, Head. It continues to state the group will play their greatest hits alongside rarities and album cuts from their nearly half-century career. To introduce the tour, group member Micky Dolenz stated: "We need to share this music once again as people want to hear music from times that made them happy. The records are being played all the time. And, the fans are still there. So, we're going to do it." "I'm looking forward to getting back together with my old buddies for some good ol' rock and roll."

Making the tour unique from previous tours was the performers' choice to depart from simply doing their greatest hits, and choosing instead to include many rare songs. "Saturday's Child", a song from the Monkees' first album that had been featured on the TV show, had never been performed live. Other choices included "I Don't Think You Know Me" and "All of Your Toys", songs that were not released until 1987 on the rarities compilation Missing Links. "Hard to Believe", a song featured on their album Pisces, Aquarius, Capricorn & Jones Ltd. but never used on the TV show, and "Someday Man", a 1969 single that never appeared on an album, were also included.

Setlist
"Scenes from The Monkees" (contains elements of "(Theme From) The Monkees") (Video Introduction)
"I'm a Believer"
"Mary, Mary"
"The Girl I Knew Somewhere"
"She Hangs Out"
"Randy Scouse Git"
"Your Auntie Grizelda"
"It's Nice to Be with You"
"I Don't Think You Know Me"
"Look Out (Here Comes Tomorrow)"
"Words"
"Cuddly Toy"
"Papa Gene's Blues"
"Listen to the Band"
"That Was Then, This Is Now"
"All of Your Toys"
"Hard to Believe"
"What Am I Doing Hangin' 'Round?"
"Sometime in the Morning"
"Valleri"
"Scenes from "Head" (Video Interlude)
"No Time"
"Circle Sky"
"Can You Dig It"
"As We Go Along"
"Long Title: Do I Have to Do This All Over Again?"
"Porpoise Song"
"Daddy's Song"
"For Pete's Sake"
"When Love Comes Knockin' (at Your Door)"
"She"
"A Little Bit Me, a Little Bit You"
"Shades of Gray"
"Last Train to Clarksville"
"Goin' Down"
"I Wanna Be Free"
"Saturday's Child"
"Someday Man"
"(I'm Not Your) Steppin' Stone"
"Daydream Believer"
Encore
"Peter Percival Patterson's Pet Pig Porky"
"Pleasant Valley Sunday"
"I'm a Believer" (Reprise)

Source:

Tour dates

Festivals and other miscellaneous performances
This concert was a part of the "Delta Classic Chastain Summer Concert Series
These concerts were a part of "Music in the Zoo"
This concert was a part of the "Stir Cove Concert Series"
This concert was a part of the "Seaside Summer Concert Series"
This concert was part of "Festa Italiana"

Cancellations and rescheduled shows

Box office score data

Critical reception
Shows on the European leg of the tour received high praise from most music critics. Jade Wright (Liverpool Echo) gave the performance at the Echo Arena Liverpool an eight out of ten. She wrote: "Showing a refreshing lack of vanity, they chose to perform against a screen showing clips from their TV show— they may be older now but the energy and enthusiasm they put into the show meant the comparison was not an unkind one".

The concert at the historic Royal Albert Hall in London received four out of five stars. Caroline Sullivan (The Guardian) felt the trio indulged the crowd with a throwback to the 60s. She writes, "With the Albert Hall full to capacity with old fans (and one or two young ones, possibly lured by their anomalous 1968 psychedelic movie Head), the Monkees are free to indulge themselves. They play 40 songs, including vaudeville numbers that involve zany voices and walks".

Further praise came from Simon Price (The Independent). He thought the concert at the Royal Concert Hall was a "crowd-pleasing performance". He explains, "Almost apologetically, they run through the reassuring hits to happy-clappy acclaim. As Jones, Dolenz and Tork lap up the applause, most of the hall is relieved they finally played "Daydream Believer". Me, I'm thinking I need to buy Head immediately. Either way, everyone's happy. And yes, they do walk the walk. As, in many senses, they always did".

External links
Monkees' Official Website

References

The Monkees
2011 concert tours
Reunion concert tours